The Regional District of Okanagan-Similkameen (RDOS) is in southern British Columbia, adjacent to the U.S. state of Washington. It is bounded by Fraser Valley Regional District to the west, Thompson-Nicola Regional District and Regional District of Central Okanagan to the north, Regional District of Kootenay Boundary to the east, and by Okanogan County, Washington to the south. At the 2011 census the population was 80,742. The administrative offices are in the City of Penticton.

Population history
 2021:  90,178 (+8.6%)
 2016:  83,022 (+2.8%)
 2011:  80,742 (+1.6%)
 2006:  79,475  (+3.7%)
 2001:  76,635 (+0.9%)
 1996: 75,933

Municipalities 
RDOS comprises six municipalities and nine rural electoral areas designated Electoral areas A - I. The municipalities of RDOS are Penticton, Summerland, Osoyoos, Oliver, Princeton, and Keremeos.

Demographics

Ethnicity 

Note: Totals greater than 100% due to multiple origin responses.

Language 
According to the 2011 Census, 84.43% of Okanagan-Similkameen's population have English as mother tongue; German is the mother tongue of 2.99% of the population, followed by Punjabi (2.86%), French (1.90%), Portuguese (1.06%), Dutch (0.80%), Ukrainian (0.42%), Hungarian (0.41%), Spanish (0.41%), and Italian (0.39%).

Electoral areas 

 Okanagan-Similkameen A
 Rural areas surrounding Osoyoos, including Anarchist Mountain to the east between Rock Creek and Osoyoos.
 Population: 2,139

 Okanagan-Similkameen B
 The valley of the Similkameen River from Cawston downstream to Chopaka, at the US border. 
 Population: 1,151

 Okanagan-Similkameen C
 Rural areas surrounding Oliver. 
 Population: 3,986

 Okanagan-Similkameen D
 Rural areas and unincorporated communities southeast of Penticton, including Okanagan Falls. 
 Population: 4,016

 Okanagan-Similkameen E
 Rural areas and unincorporated settlements to the northeast of Penticton including Naramata.  
 Population: 2,015

 Okanagan-Similkameen F
 Rural areas west of Summerland and northwest of Penticton.  
 Population: 2,092

 Okanagan-Similkameen G
 Rural areas of the middle Similkameen Valley surrounding Keremeos, including Hedley.  
 Population: 2,298

 Okanagan-Similkameen H
 Rural areas and unincorporated communities in the upper Similkameen Valley, including Tulameen and Coalmont.  
 Population: 2,232 

 Okanagan-Similkameen I
 Rural areas southwest of Penticton, including Kaleden and Apex.  
 Population: 2,207

Notes

References

External links

 
Okanagan-Similkameen